Avatar (March 10, 1972 – December 3, 1992) was an American Thoroughbred racehorse best known for winning the 1975 Belmont Stakes. He was bred and raced by San Antonio, Texas businessman Arthur A. Seeligson Jr. and trained by Tommy Doyle.

Pedigree
Avatar's sire was the highly regarded Graustark. His grandsire, Ribot, was an undefeated European Champion who won back-to-back editions of the Prix de l'Arc de Triomphe. Avatar's damsire, Mount Marcy, was a son of Epsom Derby winner, Mahmoud.

1975 U.S. Triple Crown
Although Avatar won the Grade I Santa Anita Derby under jockey Jorge Tejeira, a strong field in the 1975 Kentucky Derby saw bettors make him their fifth choice at odds of more than 11 to 1. Under new jockey Bill Shoemaker, he finished second to the heavy favorite, Foolish Pleasure while beating Frank McMahon's highly regarded colt Diabolo (3rd), Golden Chance Farm's Master Derby (4th), and the second choice among bettors, Darby Dan Farm's Florida Derby winner Prince Thou Art (6th).
 
In the ensuing Preakness Stakes, Avatar moved with the leaders as the turned for home but faded to finish fifth behind upset winner Master Derby.

The Belmont Stakes
After his performance in the 1³/16 mile Preakness, Avatar was sent off at 13 to 1 odds in the much longer 1½ mile Belmont Stakes.  In what Sports Illustrated magazine described as "a pure and exquisite exhibition of the professional jockey at his very best", Bill Shoemaker rode him to victory over runner-up Foolish Pleasure and third-place finisher Master Derby.

Racing at age 4
Avatar returned to racing in 1976 at age four. His best results in important stakes races were a win in the 12 furlong San Luis Rey Handicap on turf and second-place finishes in the Hollywood Gold Cup, Del Mar Invitational Handicap, and San Fernando Stakes.

At Stud
Retired to stud for the 1977 season, Avatar was the sire of 19 stakes winners including 1983 Canadian Champion Two-Year-Old Colt Prince Avatar. Avatar died in 1992 due to a broken neck.

From his daughter Avasand's mating to English Group One winner, Northern Baby, came Possibly Perfect, a multiple Grade I winner and 1995 American Champion Female Turf Horse

References
 Avatar's pedigree and partial racing stats
 June 16, 1975 Sports Illustrated article on the 1975 Triple Crown races titled And Now Its Avatar
 Video at YouTube of Avatar winning the 1975 Belmont Stakes

1972 racehorse births
1992 racehorse deaths
Racehorses bred in Kentucky
Racehorses trained in the United States
Belmont Stakes winners
Thoroughbred family 5-g